The Logie for Most Popular Factual Program was an award presented annually at the Australian TV Week Logie Awards. It was given to recognise the popularity of an Australian factual program.

The award was first awarded at the 50th Annual TV Week Logie Awards ceremony, held in 2008 when it was originally called Most Popular Factual Program. The award was discontinued after the 55th Annual TV Week Logie Awards in 2013, however the category was reinstated in 2016 at the 58th Annual TV Week Logie Awards. For the 2016 and 2017 ceremonies, it was renamed Best Factual Program before being permanently eliminated in 2018.

The winner and nominees of Most Popular Factual Program are chosen by the public through an online voting survey on the TV Week website. Bondi Rescue holds the record for the most wins, winning the category every year in the first six years it was awarded.

Winners and nominees
Listed below are the winners of the award for each year, as well as the other nominees.

Multiple wins/nominations

References

Awards established in 2008

2008 establishments in Australia